William "Billy" or "Willie" Herd was a Scottish-American soccer left half who earned one cap with the United States men's national soccer team. He also played eight seasons in the American Soccer League. He was born in Scotland.

Professional
In 1919, Herd began his professional career with Lochgelly United when it was reconstituted following World War I. At the time, Lochgelly United competed in the Scottish Northern and Central Leagues. In 1921, he moved to the United States where he signed with the New York Field Club of the American Soccer League season.  He moved to Paterson F.C. for the 1922–23 season.  Paterson won the 1923 National Challenge Cup over St. Louis Scullin Steel.  In 1923, he returned to New York F.C.  When New York folded following the end of the season, Herd moved to Indiana Flooring for the 1924–25 season.  In 1925, he moved to the Brooklyn Wanderers, again spending only one season with the team.  In 1926, he moved to the New York Giants, and remained with the Giants until they were expelled by the ASL during the 1928–29 season. He remained with them when they moved to the Eastern Professional Soccer League.

National team
Herd earned one cap with the U.S. national team in a 6–1 win over Canada on 11 November 1925.

See also
List of United States men's international soccer players born outside the United States

References

External links
National Soccer Hall of Fame eligibility bio

Scottish footballers
Scottish emigrants to the United States
United States men's international soccer players
American Soccer League (1921–1933) players
Lochgelly United F.C. players
New York Field Club players
Paterson F.C. (NAFBL) players
Indiana Flooring players
Brooklyn Wanderers players
New York Giants (soccer) players
Eastern Professional Soccer League (1928–29) players
Year of birth missing
Year of death missing
Association football wing halves
American soccer players
Scottish expatriate sportspeople in the United States
Expatriate soccer players in the United States
Scottish expatriate footballers